Rodén is a village in the Fuentes de Ebro municipality in the province of Zaragoza, Aragon, Spain.

The old village is on a hilltop and was abandoned as a result of the Spanish Civil War. The new village is at the foot of the hill. The ruins of the old village have been preserved.

Municipalities in the Province of Zaragoza